Anozie is a Nigerian surname. Notable people with the surname include:

Gloria Young (née Anozie, born 1967), Nigerian actress
Grace Anozie (born 1977), Nigerian athlete
Nonso Anozie (born 1978), British actor

Surnames of Nigerian origin